Fukuchi may refer to:

Fukuchi (surname), a Japanese surname
Fukuchi, Fukuoka, a town in Tagawa District, Fukuoka Prefecture, Japan
Fukuchi, Aomori, a former village in Sannohe District, Aomori Prefecture, Japan
Fukuchi Station, a railway station in Nishio, Aichi Prefecture, Japan